Jericho Historic District is a national historic district located at East Hampton, New York in Suffolk County, New York. The district includes three contributing buildings.  They are three early 19th century, Federal style residences; the remnants of a historic settlement known as "Jericho."  All are built of heavy timber-frame construction with shingled exterior sheathing.

It was added to the National Register of Historic Places in 1988.

References

Historic districts on the National Register of Historic Places in New York (state)
Historic districts in Suffolk County, New York
National Register of Historic Places in Suffolk County, New York